Saint-Maxime-du-Mont-Louis is a municipality in Quebec, Canada. Located in the administrative region of Gaspésie–Îles-de-la-Madeleine and the regional county municipality of La Haute-Gaspésie, the municipality comprises the communities of Mont-Louis, Ruisseau-des-Olives, L'Anse-Pleureuse, Les Côtes-du-Portage and Gros-Morne.

The municipality had a population of 1,118 as of the Canada 2011 Census.

The eponymous Mount Louis is one of two prominent hills that line the Bay of Mont-Louis (the other being Mount Saint-Pierre). The  hill was named after King Louis XIV of France.

History

The place was first inhabited by twelve families in 1697 and fifty-three in 1699, but was abandoned by 1702. Later that century, fishing businesses set up in the Mont-Louis Bay, east of the mouth of the Mont-Louis River. It was considered at that time as the best location on the Saint Lawrence River for cod fishing. In 1758, the post was destroyed by General James Wolfe during his Gulf of St. Lawrence Campaign.

By 1863, Mont-Louis had grown to 200 inhabitants, and four years later, the Parish of Saint-Maxime-du-Mont-Louis was founded, which was named after Maxime Tardif (1821–1850), a secretary to Bishop Pierre-Flavien Turgeon. In 1884, the municipality was established, taking its name from the parish.

Demographics

Population

Climate
The locality has a humid continental climate (Dfb) in spite of its marine position with quite cold and snowy winters combined with warm but relatively short summers. Due to its seasonal lag, September is quite some way above the  threshold for continental above subarctic, but the fifth-warmest month May is some way cooler than that. However, the lag is not as intense as in other eastern Canadian localities, with July being significantly warmer than August.

See also
 List of municipalities in Quebec

References

External links 

Municipalities in Quebec
Incorporated places in Gaspésie–Îles-de-la-Madeleine